Strange Cargo is a 1929 American mystery film directed by Arthur Gregor and starring Lee Patrick, June Nash and George Barraud. It was the first full sound film produced by Pathé Exchange, shortly afterwards to be merged into the major studio RKO Pictures. A separate silent version was also produced for theaters that had not yet been wired for sound.

It was based on a play called The Missing Man, with the adaptation worked on by an uncredited Paul Bern. The film's sets were designed by the art director Edward C. Jewell. It received a good critical reception following its Los Angeles premiere.

Premise
On board a yacht sailing from India to Britain, the owner of the vessel is murdered by one of the passengers.

Cast
 Lee Patrick as Diana Foster  
 June Nash as Ruth  
 George Barraud as Bruce Lloyd  
 Cosmo Kyrle Bellew as Sir Richard Barclay  
 Russell Gleason as Hungerford  
 Frank Reicher as Dr. Stecker  
 Claude King as Yacht Captain  
 Ned Sparks as Yacht First Mate  
 Josephine Brown as Mrs. Townsend  
 Chuck Hamilton as Boatswain  
 George Beranger as First Stranger  
 Otto Matieson as Second Stranger  
 Harry Allen as Short  
 Warner Richmond as Neil Stoker

References

Bibliography
 Fleming, E.J. Paul Bern: The Life and Famous Death of the MGM Director and Husband of Harlow. McFarland, 2008.

External links
 

1929 films
1929 mystery films
American mystery films
Films directed by Arthur Gregor
Seafaring films
Pathé Exchange films
1920s English-language films
1920s American films